The Sargodha university (SU) is a public university based in Sargodha, Punjab, Pakistan.

History
The De'Montmorency College was established at Shahpur Sadar in 1929. Later, it was renamed to Government College Sargodha. The college was shifted to Sargodha in 1946. Postgraduate classes were introduced in 1987. In 2002, it was upgraded to a full-fledged university.

Faculties
Faculty of Pharmacy
Faculty of Agriculture
Faculty of Engineering & Technology
Faculty of Medical & Health Sciences
Faculty of Science
Faculty of Social Science
School of Arts & Humanities

See also
List of universities in Pakistan

References

External links
SU official website

Public universities in Punjab, Pakistan
Educational institutions established in 1929
1929 establishments in British India
Public universities and colleges in Punjab, Pakistan
Universities and colleges in Sargodha District
Sargodha
Sargodha District